Tkach is a Slavic surname meaning "weaver". It is a common surname in Ukraine, as well as in Russia, Belarus, Poland, Slovakia, Czech Republic and Serbia.

It may refer to:
 Anna Tkach (born 1975), Russian-born Israeli sprinter
 Elena Tkach (born 1970),  Russian sport shooter
 Joseph W. Tkach (1927–1995), American religious figure
 Joseph Tkach, Jr. (born 1951), American religious figure, son of Joseph W. Tkach
 Lyubov Tkach (born 1993), Russian athlete
 Mikhail Tkach (1895–unknown), Ukrainian-born American spy
 Roman Tkach (born 1962), Ukrainian politician
 Serhiy Tkach (born 1952), Russian-born Ukrainian serial killer
 Svetlana Tkach (born 1969), Moldovan runner
 Walter R. Tkach (1917–1989), American physician
 Yaroslav Tkach (born 2001), Ukrainian speed climber
 Yuliya Tkach (born 1989), Ukrainian Olympic wrestler
 Yuriy Tkach (born 1983), Ukrainian comedian
 Zlata Tkach (1928–2006), Moldovan composer

See also
 

Ukrainian-language surnames
Occupational surnames
Surnames of Ukrainian origin